Fugazza con queso (from Genoese dialect: fugassa, Italian: focaccia), or simply Fugazza, is a common type of Argentinian pizza originating in Buenos Aires that consists of a thick pizza crust topped with onions, cheese, and sometimes olives. It is derived from a combination of Neapolitan pizza with Italian focaccia bread. 

Fugazza and its variations are believed to have been invented by a Genovese-Argentine pizza maker named Juan Banchero sometime between 1893 and 1932, who served it out of a pizza shop bearing his name. Banchero's pizza shop continues to sell Fugazza to this day in the Buenos Aires neighborhood of La Boca, which historically served as a home to Genovese immigrants to Argentina.

Characteristics and varieties 
Fugazza is typically prepared with the following ingredients: 
 Argentine pizza dough ("masa" – meaning at least three focaccia-like centimetres when served, or the more moderate "half-dough" – "media masa"), characterized by a spongy consistency, and far more water and leavening than a Neapolitan pizza crust
 low-moisture cow's milk mozzarella
 red onions
 green onion
 sweet onions
 oregano
 Parmesan cheese
 olive oil

Fugazzetta is a variation on fugazza in which the cheese is baked in between two pizza crusts (usually media masa), and the onions are placed on top.

References

Pizza styles
Flatbread dishes
Argentine cuisine
Italian cuisine
Popular culture
Cheese dishes
Snack foods
Types of food
Convenience foods
National dishes
Food combinations